Tospitis brunneiplaga is a moth in the subfamily Arctiinae. It was described by George Hampson in 1918. It is found in Bhutan.

References

Moths described in 1918
Lithosiini